The Bowling Museum of Asturias ( Museo de los Bolos de Asturias) is located in the Panes parish of Peñamellera Baja, Asturias, Spain. It is dedicated to the sport of bowling in its varied forms, mainly Asturian bowling. Opened 19 April 2003, the museum was pioneered by the municipality of Peñamellera Baja, the Principality of Asturias, and an eastern Asturian consortium. 

The interactive museum aims to provide information about the sport, its history, and its significance within the culture of Asturias. There are 1,000 pieces on exhibit across fourteen existing forms of bowling. Exhibits include information on the manufacturing process of bowling balls and bowling pins, and documents about the game's history, the oldest of which, found at Simancas, dates to 1495.

Another part of the museum is a tribute to bowling players, featuring photographs of players and teams, trophies, posters, and badges. Texts written by Gaspar Melchor de Jovellanos, Armando Palacio Valdes, Camilo Jose Cela and Celso Amieva are also included.

The building that houses the museum was constructed especially for this purpose and is annexed to the Plaza's bowling alley.

References

Bowling in Spain
Museums established in 2003
Museums in Asturias
Sports museums in Spain
2003 establishments in Spain